Brian Buur (né Sørensen; 30 December 1977) is a Danish former professional darts player.

Career

Buur reached the quarter-finals of the 2000 WDF Europe Cup, beating Martin Phillips and Kevin Painter along the way before losing to Northern Ireland's Mitchell Crooks, the eventual winner. He then reached the second round of the 2002 World Darts Trophy, beating Vincent van der Voort in the first round before losing to Raymond van Barneveld.

Buur qualified for the 2003 BDO World Darts Championship, losing in the first round to defending champion Tony David. In the 2004 World Masters, Buur defeated Andre Brantjes and Gary Anderson to reach the last 16 where he lost to David again. He then captured the 2005 British Open title, beating Michael van Gerwen in the final. Buur returned to the Lakeside in the 2006 BDO World Darts Championship where he was defeated 0–3 in the first round by another defending champion, Raymond van Barneveld. A year later, in the 2007 BDO World Darts Championship, Buur lost to former world champion John Walton in the first round.

In 2014, Buur made a comeback and made it to the final of the Danish national championships. He lost to Dennis Lindskjold, but was later picked for the Danish national team for the 2014 Europe Cup in Romania.

World Championship results

BDO

2003: First round (lost to Tony David 1–3)
2006: First round (lost to Raymond van Barneveld 0–3)
2007: First round (lost to John Walton 2–3)

External links
Profile and stats on Darts Database

1977 births
Danish darts players
Living people
British Darts Organisation players
People from Viborg Municipality
Sportspeople from the Central Denmark Region